Adam Tensta (born Adam Momodou Eriksson Taal 1 August 1983) is a Swedish rapper of Gambian descent from his father, and Finnish descent from his mother. His debut album It's a Tensta Thing was a Swedish chart topper, and was awarded the 2008 Grammis for best Dance/Hip Hop/Soul album. His song "My Cool" was featured in NBA 2k10. Adam is signed to Swedish imprint RMH, Respect My Hustle.

Discography

Albums

Music videos

References

External links

 Adam Tensta's Official justRHYMES.com music profile
 Adam Tensta on MySpace
  Official Adam Tensta Website
 Adam Tensta Interview - After my show, I try to leave the people with their hearts racing 

1983 births
Swedish socialists
English-language singers from Sweden
Swedish people of Gambian descent
Swedish people of Finnish descent
Living people
Swedish hip hop musicians
Swedish rappers